Bousso is a surname. Notable people with the surname include: 

Mame Diarra Bousso (1833–1866), Murid saint
Raphael Bousso (born 1971), German theoretical physicist and cosmologist